Anderson Township is one of seven townships in Perry County, Indiana, United States. As of the 2010 census, its population was 1,557 and it contained 644 housing units.

History
Anderson Township was named after the Anderson River.

The Huffman Mill Covered Bridge was listed on the National Register of Historic Places in 1998.

Geography

Unincorporated towns
 Gatchel at 
 Lilly Dale at 
 Ranger at 
(This list is based on USGS data and may include former settlements.)

Cemeteries
The township contains these thirteen cemeteries: Avery, Covey, Davis, Dodson, Frakes, Hammack, Hicks, Mackey, Niles, Nixon, Richards, Slaughter and Terry.

Major highways
  Indiana State Road 37

Airports and landing strips
 Perry County Municipal Airport

Lakes
 Saddle Lake

School districts
 Perry Central Community School Corporation
 Tell City-Troy Township School Corporation

Political districts
 State House District 73
 State House District 74
 State Senate District 47

References
 
 United States Census Bureau 2009 TIGER/Line Shapefiles
 IndianaMap

External links
 Indiana Township Association
 United Township Association of Indiana
 City-Data.com page for Anderson Township

Townships in Perry County, Indiana
Townships in Indiana